Píšť (1938–1945: Sandau) is a municipality and village in Opava District in the Moravian-Silesian Region of the Czech Republic. It has about 2,100 inhabitants. It is part of the historic Hlučín Region.

History
The first written mention of Píšť is from 1228.

References

External links

Villages in Opava District
Hlučín Region